Have a nice day is a service industry expression widespread throughout the English-speaking world.

Have a Nice Day may refer to:

Music 
Have a Nice Day (band), Australian power pop band from 1989 to 1994
Have a Nice Day (Bon Jovi album), 2005
"Have a Nice Day" (song), 2005
Have a Nice Day (Count Basie album), 1971
Have a Nice Day (Roxette album), 1999
"Have a Nice Day" (Stereophonics song), 2001
Have a Nice Day, a 2022 EP by Lil Xan and Chris Miles
"Have a Nice Day", a song by the Ramones, from the album ¡Adios Amigos!
"Have a Nice Day", a song by Roxanne Shante
"Have a Nice Day", an album and a song by Japanese band World Order

Other uses
Have a Nice Day (film), a 2017 Chinese film
Have a Nice Day: A Tale of Blood and Sweatsocks, a 1999 autobiography by Mick Foley
Have a N.I.C.E. day, a 1997 arcade racing game by Synetic GmbH
 "Have a Nice Day", by George Carlin from A Place for My Stuff